Česlovas Gedgaudas (1909–1986) was a Lithuanian diplomat, translator, polyglot, and amateur historian. He is best known for his pseudohistorical book In the Search for Our Past, in which he promoted the claims of Jurate Rosales and Aleksandras Račkus that the Goths and Vandals were Baltic peoples, and not Germanic or Slavic.

Biography
His father, was an artillery commander who participated in the Lithuanian Wars of Independence.

Gedgaudas attended and graduated from the Institute of Political Science at the University of Paris. He later worked at the Ministry of Foreign Affairs of Lithuania and the Lithuanian delegation in Rome. From 1945 to 1952, he lived in Paris, working as a translator at the Ministry of Foreign Affairs in France. During these years, he expanded his knowledge of Indo-European languages at the Sorbonne (Gedgaudas wrote that he knew fourteen languages, nine of them classical). He was writing his doctoral thesis on comparative linguistics, but it was never finished.

Later in his life, Gedgaudas moved to the United States, living in Chicago and California.

Works
Gedgaudas' most famous work is the book In the Search for Our Past, first published in 1972 in Mexico City, and then republished in Lithuania in 1994 and 2018. In it, Gedgaudas talks about his theory that the Balts, or Lithuanians, inhabited a large part of Europe, and that the Goths, Vandals and Veneti were actually a Baltic people. To prove his theory, he compared a set of words and place names in different languages. It is considered a pseudohistoric work, and the linguist Zigmas Zinkevičius classifies Gedgaudas, Jurate Rosales and Aleksandras Račkus as being in the same school of thought.

References 

1909 births
1986 deaths
Diplomats from Kaunas
People from Kovensky Uyezd
Lithuanian emigrants to France
Pseudohistorians
University of Paris alumni
Lithuanian emigrants to the United States